"The Trouble with Mr. Bean" is the fifth episode of the British television series Mr. Bean, produced by Tiger Television for Thames Television. It was first broadcast on ITV on 1 January 1992 and watched by 18.7 million viewers on its original broadcast, making it the highest-rated episode in the series.

Plot

Act 1: The Dentist 
Mr. Bean sets several alarms for 8:00 am, but he sleeps through all of them. He wakes up at 8:50, conducts some light exercise, shaves and takes out his clothes. Upon noticing a reminder that he has a dental appointment, he realises that he is running late and proceeds to grab his clothes, his shoes, his toothbrush and toothpaste and heads for his Mini. Rushing to the appointment, Bean proceeds to get dressed while driving, holding the accelerator down with a brick and steering with his feet as his puts his trousers on. He then brushing his teeth, rinses with the car's screenwash and spits; the contents land on the backside of a local builder, who assumes it is bird droppings.

Arriving at the dental surgery of Mr. A. M. Peggit in the nick of time, Bean parks out front, forcing the blue Reliant out of the only parking space. A traffic warden then appears, preparing to ticket the Reliant, and makes Bean notice that a part of his pyjamas is sticking out of his trousers, forcing him to remove it and toss it in his car window. Once inside the waiting room, he can't find anything good to read other than a Batman comic book in the hands of a young boy who refuses to share the book. Bean tricks the boy's mother into thinking he has wet himself by stealthily pouring water from a vase onto his lap in order to get the comic – only to find he has no time to read it as the dentist is now ready to see him.

Inside with Mr. Peggit, Bean causes mayhem behind the dentist's back, adjusting the dental chair to unusual positions and messing about with some of the equipment. Eventually, he accidentally injects the dentist's leg with a needle containing a dose of anaesthetic, causing him to fall over and then pull down an X-ray blocker, knocking him out. Feeling inconvenienced by this, Bean decides to do what the dentist was planning to do – put a filling into his tooth. Although he manages to do this, he soon finds that the holder containing the dental map of his teeth can flip vertically and horizontally, thus leaving him to drill each tooth and put filling on all of them, effectively causing them to be stuck together. Fortunately, Bean gets a fright when Mr. Peggit wakes up and this is enough to free his jaws. Satisfied with his own work, he leaves the dentist to enjoy the rest of the day.

Act 2: The Picnic 
Bean drives to the public park to have a picnic. The car park is full except for a gap between two cars only just wide enough for his Mini yet with no room to open the door, so he gets out and pushes his car into the gap, just as a car next to his car drives off. While passing by a boating lake, he spots a young boy having difficulty with his remote control led boat. Offering to help, he opens up the controller and tweaks the circuitry inside, fixing the problem. Unbeknown to both Bean and the boy, the controller also takes control of an elderly man's electric wheelchair just behind them, which goes wherever the remote control boat goes. After hogging the controller for some time, Bean hands it back to the boy and leaves just as the now empty wheelchair approaches in behind him, pushing the boy into the lake (off-screen) just as Bean finds a nice spot. He soon begins setting up his picnic which consists of a large blanket, a portable transistor radio, a cake stand, a plate, a bottle of orange juice, a small chair, a book and an iced cupcake complete with a cherry on top. Unbeknown to him, a car thief breaks into his Mini and hotwires it, only to find the steering wheel is missing; Bean had removed it and had it with him in his picnic basket.

As Bean prepares to read his book and eat his cake, a wasp suddenly buzzes around his spot and refuses to leave him alone, irritating him. He soon attempts to deal with it as it goes after his cake, swatting at it, jousting with it, chasing it around and even trying to drown it in his bottle of juice. Bean finally manages to kill it by tricking it into landing on the pages of his book and then quickly closing the book. Satisfied, he soon resumes what he was doing only to find an entire swarm of wasps coming for him, forcing him to abandon his picnic site as the end credits roll. Unable to lose them, Bean tosses his cake into a nearby car unaware that the car thief is now in it, who soon finds himself being targeted by the wasps. During this, the wheelchair we saw earlier stops by the car as the episode concludes.

Cast 
 Rowan Atkinson as Mr. Bean
 Richard Wilson as Mr. A. M. Peggit, the dentist
 Caroline Quentin as the traffic warden
 Sam Mead as the schoolboy
 Christine Ellerbeck as the schoolboy's mother
 Hugo Mendez as the boy in the park
 Michael Godley as the man in a wheelchair
 Nathan Lewis as the car thief
 Bridget Brammall as the dental nurse

Production 
Location scenes for this episode were shot on 35mm in Battersea Park, Kingston and Teddington, close to the Thames TV studios where studio sequences were recorded before a live audience.

An extended upbeat remix of the choral theme was used for the driving sequence in Act 1.

A number of inspired scenes and stories in Mr. Bean: The Animated Series:
 The scene at the dentist inspired the story for the episode called "Toothache"
 The scene between Mr. Bean and the wasp inspired a similar event for the episode "Artful Bean".
 The scene in which Mr. Bean got his shaver stuck on his nasal hair was reused for the episode "Wanted".
 The scene in which Mr. Bean stopped his coffeemaker waking him by plugging up the hose attached to it that sprayed hot water onto his feet was adapted as part of a scene in clock "Birthday Bear"

A diagram of the clock and hose invention in this episode, also featured in the book Mr Bean's Diary, released in 1993.

The Batman Comic held by the boy in Act 1 is Batman Volume 1, Issue 463.

References

External links 
 

Mr. Bean episodes
1992 British television episodes
Television shows written by Rowan Atkinson
Television shows written by Richard Curtis
Television shows written by Robin Driscoll